Eugene Nicholas Prebola (June 30, 1938 – December 10, 2021) was an American football tight end who played four seasons in the American Football League with the Oakland Raiders and Denver Broncos. He was drafted by the Detroit Lions in the 19th round of the 1960 NFL Draft. Prebola played college football at Boston University and attended Memorial High School in West New York, New Jersey. He was inducted into the Boston University Hall of Fame in 1991.

Prebola died on December 10, 2021, at the age of 83.  He is survived by his wife Patricia and four children, Karen, Kenneth, Keith, and Kristopher.

References

External links
Just Sports Stats

1938 births
2021 deaths
Players of American football from New Jersey
American football tight ends
Boston University Terriers football players
Oakland Raiders players
Denver Broncos (AFL) players
Memorial High School (West New York, New Jersey) alumni
Sportspeople from the Bronx
Players of American football from New York City
People from West New York, New Jersey
Sportspeople from Hudson County, New Jersey
American Football League players